Central Texas Electric Cooperative, Inc. is a rural utility cooperative headquartered in Fredericksburg, Texas, with suboffices in Kingsland, Texas; Llano, Texas; and Mason, Texas.

The cooperative was formed in 1947 as a split-off from neighboring Pedernales Electric Cooperative.

Currently the cooperative over 6,000 miles of line, serving over 44,000 meters in the Texas Hill Country counties of Blanco, Gillespie, Kendall, Kerr, Kimble, Llano, Mason, McCulloch, Menard, Real, and San Saba.

External links
Official Central Texas Electric Cooperative website

Electric cooperatives in Texas
Texas Hill Country
Companies based in Texas
Energy companies established in 1947
1947 establishments in Texas
Blanco County, Texas
Gillespie County, Texas
Kendall County, Texas
Kerr County, Texas
Kimble County, Texas
Llano County, Texas
Mason County, Texas
McCulloch County, Texas
Menard County, Texas
Real County, Texas
San Saba County, Texas